Robert Charles Weinberg (1902–1974) was an American architect and urban planner. He is mostly known for his projects in his native New York City, particularly relating to parks. He also worked in Chicago and Cleveland.

Early life and education 
Robert Charles Weinberg was born in New York City in 1902.

Weinberg attended the Ethical Culture Fieldston School. He earned a B.A. degree from the Harvard School of Architecture in 1926 and another degree (noted as a second B.A. or a graduate degree in different sources) from the Harvard School of City Planning in 1931.

Career 
Weinberg was hired by the newly formed New York City Parks Department in 1934. Previously, each of the city's five boroughs had its own independent parks department. These were consolidated in 1934, with Robert Moses serving as the commissioner.

Weinberg and Moses often disagreed on their philosophies of designing parks. Weinberg believed that parks should be customized to the neighborhood, while Moses preferred a more uniform design for all parks. From the late 1930s through the early 1950s, Weinberg was part of the coalition opposing a number of renovation plans for Washington Square Park that were supported by Moses. These efforts culminated in the park being closed to vehicles in 1958.

In 1939, Weinberg joined the New York Department of City Planning. Robert Moses was responsible for Weinberg's departure from the department in 1941.

From 1966 to 1971, he was a commentator and architecture critic at WNYC radio, where he discussed a variety of topics related to city planning during twice-weekly talks.

Although mainly known for his work in New York, he also did work for the Chicago Housing Authority and the Cleveland Planning Commission.

He was known for designing the Vinmont Houses in the Riverdale area of The Bronx. He had plans to build 340 low-income housing units on another nearby plot of land he owned in Riverdale. That project failed to get approval, and the plot was eventually sold to the USSR to build a residential compound for diplomats and their families.

Preservationist activities 
Weinberg was instrumental in preserving the Jefferson Market Courthouse building in the 1960s. Built in 1876, it was vacant by 1950 and slated to be demolished. A preservation drive by local residents led to the formation of The Committee for a Library in the Courthouse, with Weinberg convincing the New York Public Library to adopt the building. It is now the Jefferson Market Library.

Weinberg was also a member of the Action Group for Better Architecture in New York (AGBANY) in the early 1960s. The group was most known for working to preserve the original Pennsylvania Station building designed by McKim, Mead & White. The effort was unsuccessful and the building was demolished in 1963. He also attempted to preserve the Ziegfeld Theatre on 52nd Street however this too was demolished.

Academic, civic, and professional affiliations 
Weinberg was a fellow of the American Institute of Architects and chair of the institute's Joint Committee on Design Control. He served as the book review editor for the Journal of the American Institute of Planners from 1947 to 1959 and was the chair of their New York Regional Chapter.

Weinberg was an adjunct professor at New York University, where he created a program in City Planning. He also taught at the Pratt Institute, the New School for Social Research, and at Yale.

He was a member of the Municipal Art Society, using his position there to advocate for landmarks preservation via the Bard Act.

Vinmont 
The name Weinberg is German for "Wine Mountain", which translates to "Vinmont" in French. The Vinmont section of Riverdale, Vinmont Road, Vinmont Houses, and Vinmont Veteran Park all trace their names to Weinberg in this way.

Personal life 
Weinberg died in 1974.

References

External links 
 Around New York with Robert C. Weinberg. Audio archive of WNYC broadcasts.

1902 births
1974 deaths
American urban planners
Architects from New York City
Preservationist architects
Harvard Graduate School of Design alumni